Clidemia is a genus of flowering plants in the family Melastomataceae. It contains about 450 species, the best known being C. hirta (soapbush, or Koster's curse). The generic name honours Ancient Greek author Cleidemus.

Species

C. ablusa
C. acostae
C. acurensis
C. acutiflora
C. acutifolia
C. affinis
C. aggregata
C. agrestis
C. aguaclarensis
C. alata
C. allardii
C. alpestris
C. alternifolia
C. althaeoides
C. amblyandra
C. ampla
C. amygdaloides
C. andersonii
C. angustifolia
C. angustilamina
C. anisophylla
C. anisotrichum
C. anoriensis
C. aphanantha
C. aptera
C. aristigera
C. asperifolia
C. asplundii
C. astrotricha
C. atrata
C. attenuata
C. aurea
C. auricoma
C. australis
C. ayanagannensis
C. ayangannensis
C. barbata
C. barbeyana
C. barbinervis
C. barkleyi
C. berbiceana
C. bernardii
C. berterii
C. bifaria
C. biformis
C. biolleyana
C. biseptena
C. biserrata
C. blepharodes
C. boliviensis
C. bonplandii
C. botryophora
C. brachystachya
C. brachystephana
C. brackenridgei
C. bracteata
C. bullosa
C. buntingii
C. calcarata
C. calvescens
C. campestris
C. campii
C. candolleana
C. capillaris
C. capilliflora
C. capillipes
C. capitata
C. capitellata
C. capituliflora
C. carassana
C. caudata
C. cephalophora
C. ceramicarpa
C. cernua
C. chaetocalyx
C. chaetodon
C. chamissois
C. charadrophila
C. chinatlana
C. chocoensis
C. choetodon
C. chrysopogon
C. ciliata
C. cinerea
C. cinnamomifolia
C. claussenii
C. clementiana
C. coccinea
C. collina
C. confertiflora
C. congestiflora
C. conglomerata
C. cordata
C. cordifolia
C. cordigera
C. coriacea
C. cornoides
C. coronata
C. costaricensis
C. crenulata
C. crossosepala
C. crotonifolia
C. cruegeriana
C. cuatrecasasii
C. cubatanensis
C. cubensis
C. cuneata
C. cursoris
C. cutucuensis
C. cyanocarpa
C. cymifera
C. cymosa

C. dasytricha
C. debilis
C. decurrens
C. deflexa
C. dendroides
C. densiflora
C. dentata
C. depauperata
C. dependens
C. deppeana
C. desmantha
C. dichotoma
C. diffusa
C. diguensis
C. dimorphica
C. discolor
C. dispar
C. divaricata
C. diversifolia
C. dolichantha
C. dolichostachya
C. domingensis
C. donnell-smithii
C. drosera
C. duidae
C. ecuadorensis
C. elata
C. epibaterium
C. epiphytica
C. erostrata
C. erythropogon
C. euphorbioides
C. fallax
C. farinasii
C. fausta
C. fendleri
C. fenestrata
C. ferox
C. fissinervia
C. flexnosa
C. flexuosa
C. floribunda
C. foliosa
C. foreroi
C. foveolata
C. francavillana
C. fraterna
C. fuertesii
C. fulva
C. garcia-barrigae
C. glabrata
C. glabriflora
C. glandulifera
C. globuliflora
C. glomerata
C. graciliflora
C. gracilipes
C. gracilis
C. grandifolia
C. granvillei
C. grisebachii
C. guadaloupensis
C. guaicaipurana
C. guatemalensis
C. hammelii
C. haughtii
C. hematostemon
C. heptamera
C. herbacea
C. heterobasis
C. heteroclita
C. heteromalla
C. heteronervis
C. heteroneura
C. heterophylla
C. heteropila
C. heterotricha
C. hirsuta
C. hirta
C. hirtella
C. holosericea
C. humilis
C. imparilis
C. impetiolaris
C. inaequalifolia
C. inobsepta
C. inopogon
C. insularis
C. intermedia
C. interrupta
C. involucrata
C. japurensls
C. juruana
C. juruensis
C. kapplerii
C. killipii
C. kuhlmannii
C. lacera
C. laevifolia
C. laevigata
C. lambertiana
C. lanata
C. lappacea
C. latifolia
C. laxiflora
C. leandroides
C. leptopus
C. leptostachya
C. leucandra
C. lima
C. linearis
C. lineata
C. longibarbis
C. longifolia

C. longipedunculata
C. longisetosa
C. lopezii
C. lugubris
C. lundellii
C. lutescens
C. macrandra
C. macropetala
C. macrophylla
C. macropora
C. maculata
C. manoacensis
C. marahuacensis
C. marginata
C. martiana
C. martii
C. matudae
C. melanodesma
C. melanophylla
C. melanotricha
C. miconiastrum
C. miconioides
C. micrantha
C. micropetala
C. microphylla
C. microstachya
C. microthyrsa
C. minutiflora
C. monantha
C. monticola
C. morichensis
C. mortoniana
C. multiplinervis
C. mutabilis
C. myrmecina
C. naevula
C. naudiniana
C. neblinae
C. neglecta
C. nervosa
C. nianga
C. nivea
C. novemnervia
C. oaxacensis
C. obliqua
C. oblonga
C. obscura
C. octona
C. oligantha
C. oligochaeta
C. ombrophila
C. oocarpa
C. ossaeaeformis
C. ossaeiformis
C. ossaeoides
C. ostentata
C. ostrina
C. oxyura
C. pakaraimae
C. panamensis
C. paraguayensis
C. parasitica
C. penduliflora
C. penninervis
C. pennipilis
C. peruviana
C. petiolaris
C. petiolata
C. phaeostaphis
C. phaeotricha
C. pickeringii
C. pilosa
C. pilosissima
C. piperifolia
C. pittieri
C. platyphylla
C. pleiostemon
C. plumosa
C. polyandra
C. polystachia
C. polystachya
C. portoricensis
C. procumbens
C. pterosepala
C. pubescens
C. pulchra
C. purpurascens
C. purpurea
C. purpureo-violacea
C. pusilliflora
C. pussiliflora
C. pustulata
C. pycnantha
C. pycnaster
C. quadrisulca
C. quinquedentata
C. quinquenodis
C. quintuplinervia
C. raddiana
C. radicans
C. radulaefolia
C. ramiflora
C. rariflora
C. reclinata
C. reflexa
C. regnellii
C. reitziana
C. renggeri
C. repens
C. reticulata
C. retropila
C. reversa
C. rhamnifolia

C. rhodolasia
C. rhodopogon
C. ribesiiflora
C. riedeliana
C. rigida
C. rimbachii
C. rubella
C. rubra
C. rubrinervis
C. rubripila
C. ruddae
C. rufescens
C. rusbyi
C. sagittata
C. salicifolia
C. saltuensis
C. sandwithii
C. saulensis
C. scabrosa
C. scandens
C. scopulina
C. secunda
C. secundiflora
C. semijuga
C. septuplinervia
C. sericea
C. serpens
C. serrulata
C. sessiliflora
C. setosa
C. setosissima
C. siapensis
C. silvestris
C. silvicola
C. simplicicaulis
C. simpsonii
C. simulans
C. smithii
C. solearis
C. sparsiflora
C. spectabilis
C. spicaeformis
C. spicata
C. spondylantha
C. sprucei
C. staphidioides
C. stellipilis
C. stenopetala
C. steyermarkii
C. strigilliflora
C. strigillosa
C. striphnocalyx
C. submontana
C. subseriata
C. subspicata
C. suffruticosa
C. sulcicaulis
C. sulfurea
C. sulphurea
C. surinamensis
C. swartsii
C. sylvestris
C. taurina
C. tepuiensis
C. testiculata
C. tetragona
C. tetragonoloba
C. tetrapetala
C. tetraptera
C. tetraquetra
C. tiliaefolia
C. tillettii
C. tococoidea
C. tonduzii
C. tovarensis
C. trichocalyx
C. trichodes
C. trichogona
C. trichopetala
C. trichopoda
C. trichosantha
C. trichotoma
C. triflora
C. trinitensis
C. tristis
C. tuerckheimii
C. ulei
C. umbellata
C. umbonata
C. umbrosa
C. urceolata
C. uribei
C. urticaefolia
C. urticoides
C. utleyana
C. valenzuelana
C. vallicola
C. variifolia
C. vegaensis
C. velutina
C. venosa
C. verruculosa
C. verticillata
C. vincentina
C. violacea
C. virgata
C. vittata
C. weddellii
C. wrightii
C. xanthocoma
C. xantholasia
C. xanthopogon

References

External links

PlantSystematics.org: Phylogeny and images of Clidemia species

 
Melastomataceae genera